Edward Chapman (13 October 1901 – 9 August 1977) was an English actor who starred in many films and television programmes, but is chiefly remembered as "Mr. William Grimsdale", the officious superior and comic foil to Norman Wisdom's character of Pitkin in many of his films from the late 1950s and 1960s.

Life and career
Chapman was born in Harrogate, West Riding of Yorkshire, and was the uncle of actor/screenwriter John Chapman and actor Paul Chapman. On leaving school he became a bank clerk, but later began his stage career with the Ben Greet Players in June 1924 at the Nottingham Repertory Theatre, playing Gecko in George du Maurier's Trilby. He made his first London stage appearance at the Court Theatre in August 1925 playing the Rev Septimus Tudor in The Farmer's Wife. Among dozens of stage roles that followed, he played Bonaparte to Margaret Rawlings's Josephine in Napoleon at the Embassy Theatre in September 1934. In 1928 he attracted the attention of Alfred Hitchcock, who gave him the role of "The Paycock" in the 1930 film, Juno and the Paycock. In the same year he also made an appearance in Caste. He had a role in The Citadel in 1938 and appeared alongside George Formby in the Ealing Studios comedy Turned Out Nice Again in 1941.

During the Second World War he took a break from acting and joined the Royal Air Force. After training he was posted to 129 (Mysore) Squadron as an intelligence officer. This Spitfire squadron was based at Westhampnett and Debden. The squadron was heavily engaged in combat during this period and many of Chapman's fellow squadron mates were killed in action.

Chapman first starred alongside Norman Wisdom in 1957's Just My Luck in the role of Mr. Stoneway, but the next year in The Square Peg he appeared as Mr. Grimsdale for the first time opposite Wisdom's character of Norman Pitkin. In 1960 he and Wisdom acted together again in The Bulldog Breed, playing the roles of Mr. Philpots and Norman Puckle – Mr. Grimsdale and Pitkin in all but name. Wisdom appeared alone as Norman Pitkin in On the Beat in 1962, while Chapman branched out, starring in the Danish folktale Venus fra Vestø, but Grimsdale and Pitkin were reunited for 1963's A Stitch in Time. Their final performance together was in The Early Bird in 1965, Wisdom's first film in colour. In all, Chapman appeared alongside Norman Wisdom in five films.

After Sir John Gielgud was arrested for "persistently importuning male persons for immoral purposes", Chapman started a petition to force him to resign from Equity. Sir Laurence Olivier reportedly threw Chapman out of his dressing room when he solicited his signature for the petition.

From 1965 Chapman played mostly character roles on television. His final role was as Mr. Callon for nine episodes of the BBC's seafaring melodrama The Onedin Line between 1971 and 1972. Chapman died in August 1977 of a heart attack in Brighton, East Sussex, England at the age of 75.

Selected filmography

 Juno and the Paycock (1930) – Captain Boyle
 Murder! (1930) – Ted Markham
 Caste (1930) – Sam Gerridge
 The Skin Game (1931) – Dawker
 Tilly of Bloomsbury (1931) – Percy Welwyn
 The Flying Squad (1932) – Sedeman
 Happy Ever After (1932) – Colonel
 The Queen's Affair (1934) – Soldier
 Guest of Honour (1934) – Montague Tidmarsh
 The Church Mouse (1934) – Mr. 'Pinky' Wormwood
 Blossom Time (1934) – Meyerhoffer
 Girls Will Be Boys (1934) – Grey
 Royal Cavalcade (1935) – Narrator (voice)
 The Divine Spark (1935) – Saverio Mercadante
 Things to Come (1936) – Pippa Passworthy / Raymond Passworthy
 Someone at the Door (1936) – Price
 The Man Who Could Work Miracles (1936) – Major Grigsby
 Rembrandt (1936) – Fabrizius
 Love and How to Cure It (1937)
 Who Killed John Savage? (1937) – Inspector Chortley
 Premiere (1938) – Lohrmann
 I've Got a Horse (1938) – George
 The Citadel (1938) – Joe Morgan
 Marigold (1938) – Mordan
 The Nursemaid Who Disappeared (1939) – Jenks
 The Four Just Men (1939) – 'B. J'
 There Ain't No Justice (1939) – Sammy Sanders
 Poison Pen (1939) – Len Griffin
 Inspector Hornleigh on Holiday (1939) – Captain Edwin Fraser
 The Proud Valley (1940) – Dick Parry
 Convoy (1940) – Captain Eckersley
 Law and Disorder (1940) – Detective Inspector Bray
 The Briggs Family (1940) – Charley Briggs
 Inspector Hornleigh Goes To It (1941) – Mr. Blenkinsop
 Turned Out Nice Again (1941) – Uncle Arnold
 Jeannie (1941) – Mr. Jansen
 Ships with Wings (1942) – Papadopoulos
 They Flew Alone (1942) – Mr. Johnson
 The October Man (1947) – Mr. Peachy
 It Always Rains on Sunday (1947) – George Sandigate
 Mr. Perrin and Mr. Traill (1948) – Birkland
 The History of Mr. Polly (1949) – Mr. Johnson
 Man on the Run (1949) – Chief Inspector Mitchell
 The Spider and the Fly (1949) – Minister for War
 Madeleine (1950) – Dr. Thompson
 Night and the City (1950) – Hoskins (uncredited)
 Gone to Earth (1950) – Mr. James
 The Magic Box (1951) – Father in Family Group
 His Excellency (1952) – The Admiral
 The Card (1952) – Herbert Duncalf
 Mandy (1952) – Ackland
 The Ringer (1952) – Stranger
 Folly to Be Wise (1953) – Joseph Byres M.P.
 The Intruder (1953) – Lowden
 A Day to Remember (1953) – Mr. Robinson
 The End of the Road (1954) – Works Manager
 The Crowded Day (1954) – Mr. Bunting
 The Love Match (1955) – Mr. Longworth
 A Yank in Ermine (1955) – Duke of Fontenham
 Bhowani Junction (1956) – Thomas Jones
 Lisbon (1956) – Edgar Selwyn
 X the Unknown (1956) – John Elliott
 Doctor at Large (1957) – Wilkins
 Just My Luck (1957) – Mr. Stoneway
 Innocent Sinners (1958) – Manley
 The Square Peg (1958) – Mr. Grimsdale
 The Young and the Guilty (1958) – George Connor
 The Rough and the Smooth (1959) – Willy Catch
 School for Scoundrels (1960) – Gloatbridge
 Oscar Wilde (1960) – Marquis of Queensberry
 The Bulldog Breed (1960) – Mr. Philpots
 Venus fra Vestø (1962) – Englænder
 A Stitch in Time  (1963) – Mr. Grimsdale
 Hide and Seek (1964) – McPherson
 Joey Boy (1965) – Tom Hobson
 The Early Bird (1965) – Mr. Grimsdale
 The Man Who Haunted Himself (1970) – Barton

Selected stage appearances
 Blue Comet by Eden Phillpotts (1927)
 The Combined Maze by Frank Vosper (1927)
 Leave It to Psmith by Ian Hay and P.G. Wodehouse (1930)
 The Good Companions by J.B. Priestley (1931)
 Chase the Ace by Anthony Kimmins (1935)

References

External links

1901 births
1977 deaths
English male film actors
English male television actors
Male actors from Yorkshire
Actors from Harrogate
Royal Air Force Volunteer Reserve personnel of World War II
20th-century English male actors
Royal Air Force officers
British male comedy actors